Dulliken railway station is a railway station in the municipality of Dulliken, in the Swiss canton of Solothurn. It is an intermediate stop on the Olten–Aarau line and is served by local trains only.

Services 
The following services stop at Dulliken:

 Aargau S-Bahn : hourly service between Olten and Rotkreuz.

References

External links 
 
 

Railway stations in the canton of Solothurn
Swiss Federal Railways stations